The 1967 Macdonald Brier, Canada's national men's curling championship was held March 6–10 at the Hull Arena in Hull, Quebec. The event was originally planned to be played at the Ottawa Civic Centre in Ottawa, but it was later decided to hold the event across the Ottawa River in Hull as the Civic Centre was not going to be completed in time to host the event.

In the "Centennial" Brier, Team Ontario, who was skipped by 28 year old "Alfie" Phillips Jr. captured the Brier Tankard by finishing round robin play with a 9–1 record. This was Ontario's third Brier championship and their first since 1939. This would also Phillips' only career Brier appearance. Manitoba and Saskatchewan finished tied for runner-up with 8–2 records as Manitoba defeated Saskatchewan in the final draw preventing a tiebreaker playoff.

Phillips' rink would go onto represent Canada at the 1967 Scotch Cup, which they took third.

Teams
The teams are listed as follows:

Round robin standings

Round robin results

Draw 1

Draw 2

Draw 3

Draw 4

Draw 5

Draw 6

Draw 7

Draw 8

Draw 9

Draw 10

Draw 11

Awards

All-Star Team
The media selected the following curlers as All-Stars.

Bernie Sparkes was the first curler to make an All-Star team more than once as he also made the team the previous year.

Ross G.L. Harstone Award
The Ross Harstone Award was presented to the player chosen by their fellow peers as the curler who best represented Harstone's high ideals of good sportsmanship, observance of the rules, exemplary conduct and curling ability.

References
Curling Canada: 1967 Macdonald Brier

External links
1967 MacDonald Brier on YouTube

Canadian Centennial
1967
Curling in Ottawa
Curling competitions in Quebec
Sport in Gatineau
1967 in Quebec
March 1967 sports events in Canada
1967 in Canadian curling
1960s in Ottawa